George Arkwright (20 August 1807 – 5 February 1856) was an English Conservative Party politician. He was a Member of Parliament (MP) for Leominster from 1842 until his death in 1856.

Arkwright was born in Bakewell, Derbyshire, the great-grandson of Sir Richard Arkwright.  He was educated at Eton and Trinity College, Cambridge, receiving his B.A. in 1830 and his M.A. in 1833. He was called to the bar from Lincoln's Inn in 1833.  At the 1837 general election Arkwright stood unsuccessfully for a seat in Parliament from Northern Derbyshire, but he was elected unopposed in Leominster at a by-election in February 1842. He died aged 48 in Piccadilly.

Notes

Sources
 Gentleman's Magazine obituary

External links 
 

1807 births
1856 deaths
Alumni of Trinity College, Cambridge
Conservative Party (UK) MPs for English constituencies
Members of Lincoln's Inn
UK MPs 1841–1847
UK MPs 1847–1852
UK MPs 1852–1857
People educated at Eton College
English barristers